Pseudobabylonella is a genus of sea snails, marine gastropod mollusks in the subfamily Admetinae of the family Cancellariidae, the nutmeg snails.

Species
Species within the genus Plesiotriton include:
 † Pseudobabylonella fusiformis (Cantraine, 1835) 
 Pseudobabylonella minima (Reeve, 1856)
 †Pseudobabylonella nysti (Hörnes, 1854) 
 †Pseudobabylonella pusilla (Philippi, 1843) 
Synonyms
 Pseudobabylonella brasiliensis (Verhecken, 1991): synonym of Microcancilla brasiliensis (Verhecken, 1991)

References

External links
 Brunetti M.M., Della Bella G., Forli M. & Vecchi G. (2009). La famiglia Cancellariidae Forbes & Hanley, 1851 (Gastropoda) nel Plio-Pleistocene italiano: i generi Bonellitia, Pseudobabylonella n. gen., Admete e Cancellicula Tabanelli, 2008, con descrizione di tre nuove specie. Bollettino Malacologico. 45(2): 55-81

 
Cancellariidae